
This is a list of national primary roads, national secondary roads, regional roads, and officially designated scenic routes in County Mayo in Ireland.

National primary roads

 N5 road     Longford — Westport, County Mayo
 N17 road     Collooney, County Sligo — Charlestown, County Mayo — Galway
 N26 road     Swinford — Ballina, County Mayo

National secondary roads

 N58 road     Bellavary — Foxford, County Mayo
 N59 road     Belladrehid, County Sligo — Westport, County Mayo — Galway
 N60 road     Roscommon — Castlebar, County Mayo
 N83 road     Tuam, County Galway — Ballyhaunis — Glentavraun, County Mayo
 N84 road     Galway — Castlebar, County Mayo

Regional roads

 R293 road     Ballynaboll, County Sligo — Ballaghaderreen, County Roscommon — Ballyhaunis, County Mayo
 R294 road     Boyle, County Roscommon — Tobercurry, County Sligo — Ballina, County Mayo
 R297 road     Dromore West, County Sligo — Dooyeaghvy, County Mayo
 R300 road     Partry, County Mayo — An Fhairche, County Galway
 R310 road     Castlebar — Rahans, County Mayo
 R311 road     Castlebar — Newport, County Mayo
 R312 road     Castlebar — Bellacorick, County Mayo
 R313 road     Bangor — An Fod Dubh, County Mayo
 R314 road     Béal an Mhuirthead — Ballycastle — Ballina, County Mayo
 R315 road     Pontoon — Crossmolina — Ballycastle, County Mayo
 R316 road     Bogadoon — Crossmolina, County Mayo
 R317 road     Newport — Boggy, County Mayo
 R318 road     Foxford — Pontoon, County Mayo
 R319 road     Mallaranny — Keem, County Mayo
 R320 road     Swinford — Claremorris, County Mayo
 R321 road     Ballylahan — Bohola — Kiltimagh, County Mayo
 R322 road     Kiltimagh — Kilkelly, County Mayo
 R323 road     Kiltimagh — Knock — Ballyhaunis, County Mayo
 R324 road     Balla — Kiltimagh, County Mayo
 R325 road     Glentavraun, County Mayo — Cloonarragh, County Roscommon
 R327 road     Cuilmore, County Mayo — Pollremon, County Galway
 R328 road     Ballindine, County Mayo — Moylough, County Galway
 R329 road     Knock, County Mayo (Part Old National Route 17)
 R330 road     Westport — Partry, County Mayo
 R331 road     Claremorris — Ballinrobe, County Mayo
 R332 road     Moylough — Tuam, County Galway — Kilmaine, County Mayo
 R334 road     Ballinrobe — Neale, County Mayo — Headford, County Galway
 R335 road     Westport — Louisburgh — Leenane, County Mayo
 R345 road     An Mám, County Galway — Neale, County Mayo
 R346 road     Cong — Cross, County Mayo
 R373 road     Breaffy — Castlebar, County Mayo
 R375 road     Swinford — Kilkelly, County Mayo
 R376 road     Lurga Upper — Knock Airport, County Mayo
 R378 road     Louisburgh — Roonagh Pier, County Mayo
 R917 road     Spencer Street, Castlebar, County Mayo
 R928 road     Pearse Street, Ballina, County Mayo
 R929 road     Main Street, Ballyhaunis, County Mayo

Designated scenic roads

Highly scenic vistas

 R310 south of Lough Conn and north of Lough Cullin (looking to both lakes)
 R313 from Blacksod Point to Fallmore Bay (looking towards Blacksod Bay)
 R314 at Céide Fields (looking towards the Atlantic Ocean)
 R315 from Cuilkillew to Pontoon (looking towards Lough Conn)
 R319 from Achill to Achill Sound (looking towards Achill Sound)
 R335 from west of Kilsallagh to Westport (looking towards both Croagh Patrick and Clew Bay)
 R335 from Cregganbaun to Delphi (looking towards the Sheeffry Hills and Doo Lough)
 Local road north of Pollatomish (looking towards Broad Haven)
 Local road west of Carrowmore Lake, from Barnatra to the R313 junction (looking towards Carrowmore Lake)
 Local road at Dooyork (looking towards Blacksod Bay)
 Local road from Owenmore Bridge to Doo Lough (looking towards the Sheeffry Hills and Owenduff Lake)
 Local road from the R312 junction north of Keenagh, running to the west of Furnace Lough, to Newport (looking towards the Beg Range, Lough Feeagh and Furnace Lough)
 Local roads west of Lough Mask from Tourmakeady to Maumtrasna and from Tream to Cappanacreha (looking towards both the Partry Mountains and Lough Mask)
 Local road north-east of Lough Carra, from Carnacon to north of Ballygarries (looking towards Lough Carra)
 Local roads north-west of Lough Mask, from Cordarragh to Tourmakeady and from Croaghrimbeg to Bohaun (looking towards the Partry Mountains)

Scenic routes

 N59 from Westport to the southern boundary with County Galway
 N59 from Bangor to east of Rosturk
 R294 from west of Bunnyconellan to the boundary with Co. Sligo
 R297 from Castleconor to Crockets Town
 R312 from Derreen to Beltra Lough (along the coast, west of the Beg Mountain Range)
 R313 from Bellmullet to Blacksod Point
 R314 from Belderrig to Bunatrahir Bay and from Glenamoy to Barnatra
 R315 from Lahardaun to Pontoon (west of Lough Conn)
 R319 from Mulrany to south of Bunacurry (northern part of Achill Island)
 R335 from Westport to Aasleagh
 L134 from Knockmore to north of Ross West (between Lough Conn and Lough Cullin)
 L141 from south of Bunacurry to Dooagh
 L141A around Lough Keel
 Local road around Corraun Peninsula
 Local road (i.e. "The Atlantic Drive") at Dooega Head (southern part of Achill Island), from the R319 through Dooega, Cloghmore and Derreen
 Local road from Maumtrasna to Srah (west of Lough Mask)
 Local road from Maumtrasna to Cong (south of Lough Mask)
 Local road from south of Pollatomish to Barnatra
 Local road to the west shores of Carrowmore Lake, from Barnatra to the R313 junction
 Local road from Geesala and around the peninsula
 Local road from Killsallagh to Owenmore Bridge
 Local road from Liscarney to Doo Lough
 Local road north-west of the Sheeffry Hills from Louisburgh to Kinnadooley and to Cregganbaun
 Local road from Beltra to the R315 junction at Lough Conn
 Local road from Killala to Moyne Abbey
 Local road east of Lough Conn, from Garrycloonagh to Brackwanshagh
 Local road west of Lough Conn, from the R312 junction north of Keenagh to Newport
 Local road from south of Swinford to Kilkelly
 Local road from Srahmore, running west of Furnace Lough, to Newport
 Local roads north-west of Lough Mask, from Cordarragh to Tourmakeady and from Croaghrimbeg to Bohaun
 Local road north of Achill Island, from Bunacurry to Doogort

References

Roads in County Mayo
Mayo
Roads